"I Can't Lie to Me" is a song co-written and recorded by American country music artist Clay Davidson.  It was released in July 2000 as the second single from the album Unconditional.  The song reached #26 on the Billboard Hot Country Singles & Tracks chart.  The song was written by Davidson, Kenny Beard and Casey Beathard.

Chart performance

Notes

References

2000 singles
2000 songs
Clay Davidson songs
Songs written by Kenny Beard
Songs written by Casey Beathard
Song recordings produced by Scott Hendricks
Virgin Records singles